The flag of the Livonians is a flag used to symbolize the Livonian people. It is in use of various Livonian cultural groups. The flag's proportions are 2:1:2 and the ratio of the height of the flag to its width is fixed at 1:2, similarly to the Flag of Latvia. 

The green represents forests, white represents the shore (of the Livonian coast) and blue represents the ocean. These represent Livonian fishing culture, and the colors symbolize the view of a fisherman when he looks to the coast. The flag was first used by the Livonian Society (Līvõd Īt) on November 18, 1923.

Gallery

References

External links 
 Livones.lv: The Liv flag

Livonians
Flag
Livonians
Flags introduced in 1923